Motorcycle racing is a popular competitor and spectator sport in Great Britain. Several meetings take place every weekend of the motorport season, at various circuits across the country. These range from club or national series, like the Thundersport GB series, to higher profile events like the British Superbike Championship. The age of competitors in circuit racing ranges from juniors of 12 years to people in their 60s or occasionally older. Due to the large number of competitors and the hazardous nature of the sport, and despite the best efforts of organising bodies and redesign of circuits, there have been many rider deaths recorded. Often these deaths occur in series without a major media profile and therefore receive very little press coverage. The worst single incident occurred in 1971 when Peter Pritchard, Patrick Sheridan and Philip Smith all died as the result of a sidecar crash at Oulton Park.

This article is a partial list of riders known to have died competing in British national or club racing series at any level.

+ = Multiple riders to have died as the result of a single incident (see previous/following entry)

References 

Motorcycle racing series
Motorsport in the United Kingdom

Motorcycle racing in the United Kingdom